Royal Air Force Halesworth or more simply RAF Halesworth is a former Royal Air Force station located  north east of the town of Halesworth, Suffolk, England and  west of Southwold.

United States Army Air Forces use
Halesworth was built in 1942–1943 and was intended for use as a bomber station, and was built as such with a 6,000 ft. main runway and two secondary runways of 4,200 ft length.  There was an encircling perimeter track with 51 hardstands and two T-2 hangars.  Nissen hut accommodations for about 3,000 personnel were also built south of the airfield.

USAAF Station Units assigned to RAF Halesworth were: 
 474th Sub-Depot
 18th Weather Squadron
 328th Station Complement Squadron
 Headquarters (95th Combat Bomb Wing)
Regular Army Station Units included:
 1235th Quartermaster Company
 1800th Ordnance Supply & Maintenance Company 
 867th Chemical Company
 983rd Military Police Company
 2106th Engineer Fire Fighting Platoon

The airfield was assigned USAAF designation Station 365 (HA).

56th Fighter Group 

The first unit to use Halesworth was the 56th Fighter Group which arrived from RAF Horsham St Faith on 9 July 1943. Its operational squadrons were:
 61st Fighter Squadron (HV)
 62d Fighter Squadron (LM)
 63d Fighter Squadron (UN)

Being only eight miles from the Suffolk coast, Halesworth was ideally located for escort fighter operations, where range was an important factor.  For this reason the 56th Fighter Group was moved there.  Flying Republic P-47 Thunderbolts, the group flew numerous missions over France, the Low Countries, and Germany to escort bombers attacking industrial establishments, V-weapon sites, submarine pens, and other targets on the Continent.

In addition the 56th strafed and dive-bombed airfields, troops, and supply points; attacked the enemy communications; and flew counter-air patrols.

The 56th became one of the most outstanding fighter organisations in the Eighth Air Force, producing many of the top fighter aces including Francis Gabreski and Robert S. Johnson. The group was responsible for pioneering most of the successful fighter escort tactics with the Thunderbolt and had many successes while operating from Halesworth.

On 19 April 1944 the group had to vacate the airfield as it was needed for a new B-24 Liberator group and was transferred to RAF Boxted.

489th Bombardment Group (Heavy) 

  
The Eighth Air Force 489th Bombardment Group (Heavy) arrived at RAF Halesworth from Wendover AAF Utah on 1 May 1944.  The group was assigned to the 20th Combat Bombardment Wing and the group tail code was a "Circle-W".  Its operational squadrons were:
 844th Bombardment Squadron (4R)
 845th Bombardment Squadron (T4)
 846th Bombardment Squadron (8R)
 847th Bombardment Squadron (S4)

The 489th flew the Consolidated B-24 Liberator as part of the Eighth Air Force's strategic bombing campaign. The group entered combat on 30 May 1944, and during the next few days concentrated on targets in France in preparation for the Normandy invasion.

In an attack against coastal defences near Wimereaux on 5 June 1944, the group's lead plane was seriously crippled by enemy fire, its pilot was killed, and the deputy group commander, Lt. Col. Leon R. Vance Jr., who was commanding the formation, was severely wounded; although his right foot was practically severed, Vance took control of the plane, led the group to a successful bombing of the target, and managed to fly the damaged aircraft to the coast of England, where he ordered the crew to bail out; believing a wounded man had been unable to jump, he ditched the plane in the English Channel and was rescued. For his action during this mission, Vance was awarded the Medal of Honor.

The group supported the landings in Normandy on 6 June 1944, and afterward bombed coastal defences, airfields, bridges, railroads, and V-weapon sites in the campaign for France. It began flying missions into Germany in July, and engaged primarily in bombing strategic targets such as factories, oil refineries and storage plants, marshalling yards, and airfields in Ludwigshafen, Magdeburg, Brunswick, Saarbrücken, and other cities until November 1944.

Other operations included participating in the saturation bombing of German lines just before the breakthrough at Saint-Lô in July, dropping food to the liberated French and to Allied forces in France during August and September, and carrying food and ammunition to the Netherlands later in September.

The 489th Bomb Group returned to Bradley AAF Connecticut in November 1944 to prepare for redeployment to the Pacific theater. Redesignated 489th Bombardment Group (Very Heavy) in March 1945 and was re-equipped with Boeing B-29 Superfortresses. The group was alerted for movement overseas in the summer of 1945, but war with Japan ended before the group left the US. Inactivated on 17 October 1945.

5th Emergency Rescue Squadron 

In January 1945 the 5th Emergency Rescue Squadron moved to Halesworth from RAF Boxted with special P-47s, OA-10 Catalina amphibians and Boeing SB-17 Fortresses equipped with lifeboats for air-sea rescue work. The 5th ERS remained active, and it conducted many rescues until the end of hostilities.

The airfield was also used until the end of the war as an operational training airfield for North American P-51 Mustang pilots.

Post-war Governmental use
After the war, the Halesworth was closed for flying in February 1946. It was turned over to the Ministry of Food for storage until it was sold in 1963.

Civil use
With the end of government control, the land was returned to agricultural use and little of the wartime buildings remains; a few derelict huts and ancillary buildings on some of the dispersed sites. Most of the remaining runways, perimeter track, etc. are now utilised as part of the Bernard Matthews turkey production site, with a number of large sheds erected on the runways.

In May 1983 the 489th Bomb Group was permanently commemorated by the dedication of a granite memorial which has been erected on a small plot of land at the southern end of the old north-south runway. Adjacent to this is a memorial to the 56th Fighter Group who also flew from Halesworth. Nearby is the Halesworth Airfield Museum, whose exhibits include photographs, unit memorabilia and many other items relating to the airfield, its wartime occupants and activities. The museum displays a limited collection of 489th memorabilia, but the main 489th Bomb Group Museum, together with that of the 93rd Bomb Group, is sited at Hardwick, in Norfolk.

The cockpit section of a C-54 is on display at the old combat mess site which is further along the road from the memorials, and a drop tank gives details of the three groups who served at Halesworth airfield during World War II. There is a wall plaque in nearby St. Peter's Church, Holton, in honour of all who flew from this airfield, and the church has kneelers made by 489th Bomb Group veterans' wives.

Dotted around the site, at the edges of old runways and taxi paths, are a number of large wind turbines, and a large solar panel farm is at the western end of it.

In February 2007, Halesworth was reported as the location for an outbreak of so-called 'bird flu', resulting in the culling of 159,000 turkeys at Bernard Matthews.

See also

List of former Royal Air Force stations

References

Citations

Bibliography
 Freeman, Roger A. (1978) Airfields of the Eighth: Then and Now. After the Battle 
 Freeman, Roger A. (2001) The Mighty Eighth: The Colour Record. Cassell 
 Maurer, Maurer (1983). Air Force Combat Units of World War II. Maxwell AFB, Alabama: Office of Air Force History. .
 Bowyer, Michael J.F. (1979) Action Stations: 1. Military airfields of East Anglia. Patrick Stephens *

External links

 Halesworth Airfield Museum Official Website
   www.controltowers.co.uk Halesworth
 Fred Preller Mighty 8th Cross-reference Halesworth
 The American Air Museum Archive - "Halesworth" search results
 USAAS-USAAC-USAAF-USAF Aircraft Serial Numbers--1908 to present

Airfields of the VIII Fighter Command in Suffolk
Royal Air Force stations in Suffolk